International Settlement may refer to:
 International Settlement (San Francisco), a lost entertainment area of San Francisco which was prominent between the 1930s through the 1950s
 Shanghai International Settlement, territory in Shanghai leased to Britain and the United States in the 19th and early 20th centuries
 International Settlement (film), a 1938 American film set in the Shanghai International Settlement